Killing Jesus is a 2017 Colombian drama film directed by Laura Mora.

Plot
The film tells the story of a photographer whose father is killed by an assassin, whom she later gets to know. The story is based on the biography of Laura Mora whose father was killed in Medellín. Both leading roles are played by amateur actors.

Cast
 Natasha Jaramillo as Paula 'Lita'
 Giovanny Rodríguez as Jesús
 Camilo Escobar as Jose Maria
 Carmenza Cossio as Alicia

Recognition
In August 2018, it was one of four films shortlisted to be the Colombian entry for the Best Foreign Language Film at the 91st Academy Awards.

References

External links
 
 Laura Mora on Killing Jesus. Video Interview by Thomas Haemmerli

2017 films
2017 drama films
Colombian drama films
Colombian crime films
2010s Spanish-language films
Films about revenge
2010s Colombian films